Measuring Business Excellence is a quarterly peer-reviewed academic journal covering Performance management and measurement. The editors-in-chief are Jos van Iwaarden (RSM Erasmus University) and Giovanni Schiuma (Università degli Studi della Basilicata). The journal was established in 1997 and is published by Emerald Group Publishing in association with the Performance Management Association. The journal is abstracted and indexed in ABI/Inform, DIALOG, Inspec, ProQuest databases, and Scopus.

External links 
 
 Performance Management Association

Emerald Group Publishing academic journals
English-language journals
Business and management journals
Publications established in 1997
Quarterly journals